The Book of the Later Han, also known as the History of the Later Han and by its Chinese name Hou Hanshu, is one of the Twenty-Four Histories and covers the history of the Han dynasty from 6 to 189 CE, a period known as the Later or Eastern Han. The book was compiled by Fan Ye and others in the 5th century during the Liu Song dynasty, using a number of earlier histories and documents as sources.

Background 
In 23 CE, Han dynasty official Wang Mang was overthrown by a peasants' revolt known as the Red Eyebrows. His fall separates the Early (or Western) Han Dynasty from the Later (or Eastern) Han Dynasty.

As an orthodox history, the book is unusual in being completed over two hundred years after the fall of the dynasty. Fan Ye's primary source was the Dongguan Han Ji (東觀漢記; "Han Records of the Eastern Lodge"), which was written during the Han dynasty itself.

Contents
The book is part of four early historiographies of the Twenty-Four Histories canon, together with the Records of the Grand Historian, Book of Han and Records of the Three Kingdoms. Fan Ye used earlier histories, including accounts by Sima Qian and Ban Gu, along with many others (some had similar names, such as the Han Records of the Eastern Lodge by various contemporaries throughout the 2nd century, and the Records of Later Han by Yuan Hong from the 4th century), most of which did not survive intact.

The section on the Treatise on the Western Regions was based on a report composed by Ban Yong (with a few later additions) and presented to Emperor An of Han in around 125. It presumably includes notes from his father Ban Chao. It forms the 88th chapter (or 118th chapter in some editions) of the Book of the Later Han, and is a key source for the cultural and socio-economic data on the Western Regions, including the earliest accounts of Daqin (the Roman Empire), and some of the most detailed early reports on India and Central Asia. It contains a few references to events occurring after the death of Emperor An, including a brief account of the arrival of the first official envoys from Rome in 166.

Fan Ye, himself, clearly says that the new information contained in this section on the Western Regions, is largely based on information from the report of Ban Yong:

"Ban Gu has recorded in detail the local conditions and customs of each kingdom in the former book [Book of Han or 'History of the Former Han Dynasty']. Now, the reports of the Jianwu period [25-56] onwards recorded in this 'Chapter on the Western Regions' differ from the earlier [ones by Ban Gu]; they are from Ban Yong's report [presented] at the end of [the reign of] Emperor An [107-125], and so on."

Annals (紀)

Biographies (列傳)

Records (志)

References

Citations

Sources 

 General

 Chavannes, Édouard (1906). "Trois généraux chinois de la dynastie des Han orientaux. Pan Tch’ao (32-102 p.C.); – son fils Pan Yong; – Leang K’in (112 p.C.). Chapitre LXXVII du Heou Han chou." T'oung Pao, Série II, Vol. 7, pp. 210–269.
 
 
 Yu, Taishan. 2004. A History of the Relationships between the Western and Eastern Han, Wei, Jin, Northern and Southern Dynasties and the Western Regions. Sino-Platonic Papers No. 131 March, 2004. Dept. of East Asian Languages and Civilizations, University of Pennsylvania.
 Tan, Jiajian, Hou Hanshu (Book of Later Han). Encyclopedia of China (Chinese Literature Edition), 1st ed.
   Contains Wylie's English translation of Volumes 85 (History of the Eastern Barbarians), 86 (History of the Southern and South-Western Barbarians) and 87 (History of the Western Keang) of the Book of the Later Han.

Further reading 
 Yap, Joseph P. (2019). The Western Regions, Xiongnu and Han, from the Shiji, Hanshu and Hou Hanshu. .

External links 
 Silk Road Seattle - University of Washington (The Silk Road Seattle website contains many useful resources including a number of full-text historical works, maps, photos, etc.)
 Hou Han Shu
 Book of Later Han 《後漢書》 Chinese text with matching English vocabulary

Twenty-Four Histories
5th-century history books
History books about the Han dynasty
Liu Song dynasty
5th-century Chinese books